John Harding (died 1610) was an English churchman and academic. He was Regius Professor of Hebrew at Oxford from 1591 to 1598, and President of Magdalen College, Oxford, from 1607. He was also involved in the translation of the Authorized King James Version, becoming leader of the First Oxford Company of translators after the death of John Rainolds.

Life

He was a demy of Magdalen College. He graduated B.A. 1578 and M.A. 1581. He proceeded B.D. 1592, and D.D. 1597.

He became a Fellow of Magdalen College, and was proctor in 1589. He was rector of Great Haseley, Oxfordshire, from 1597, and a prebendary of Lincoln Cathedral from 1604.

Family
He had three sons and four daughters by his wife Isabel (married before, under the name Clarke), including the translator and alchemist John Harding (died 1665), rector of Brinkworth.

References

1610 deaths
16th-century English Anglican priests
17th-century English Anglican priests
Presidents of Magdalen College, Oxford
Translators of the King James Version
17th-century English translators
Year of birth missing
16th-century births
16th-century scholars
17th-century scholars
16th-century English educators
17th-century English educators
Fellows of Magdalen College, Oxford
Regius Professors of Hebrew (University of Oxford)